The San Juan 23 is an American trailerable sailboat that was designed by Canadian Bruce Kirby and Don Clark as a cruiser and first built in 1975.

The San Juan 23 is a cruising development of the San Juan 24 International Offshore Rule Quarter Ton class racer.

Production
The design was built by the Clark Boat Company of Kent, Washington, United States from 1975 until 1984, when the Clark Boat Company went out of business. Production was then assumed by San Juan Sailboats until 1989. A total of more than 600 boats were completed, but the design is now out of production.

The San Juan 23 was also built in Australia as the Windward 7 and in New Zealand as the Fleetwood 25.

Design
The San Juan 23 is a recreational keelboat, built predominantly of fiberglass. It has a masthead sloop rig, a raked stem, a reverse transom, a transom-hung rudder controlled by a tiller and a fixed fin keel or stub keel and centerboard. The fixed keel model displaces  and carries  of lead ballast, while the stub keel and centerboard model displaces  and carries  of lead ballast.

The boat is normally fitted with a small  outboard motor for docking and maneuvering.

The main cabin also has a folding table. The head is located in the bow cabin on the port side, under the "V"-berth.

Operational history
In a 2010 review Steve Henkel wrote, "best features: The layout below purportedly will sleep five, but the long, 11-foot berth to starboard wouldn't be comfortable for two six-footers. However, for extra-tall sailors, that berth is perfect. Worst features: Control of hull weight at the factory evidently was not a priority. Reportedly some boats weighed 1,000 pounds over the claimed weight of 3,000 pounds. Shoppers for used boats who plan to race might weigh before buying; the lighter boats are faster."

See also
List of sailing boat types

References

    

Keelboats
1970s sailboat type designs
Sailing yachts 
Trailer sailers
Sailboat type designs by Bruce Kirby
Sailboat type designs by Don Clark
Sailboat types built in Australia
Sailboat types built in New Zealand
Sailboat types built by Clark Boat Company